Kambly may refer to:

Kambly, a biscuit factory
Oscar Kambly, the founder of Kambly
Johann Melchior Kambly, a Swiss sculptor